Duke Williams is an American musician, who fronted the musical group Duke Williams and the Extremes. Their song "Chinese Chicken" was featured on the breakbeat compilation Ultimate Breaks and Beats. Richie Sambora played with Williams before forming Bon Jovi.

The band released two albums on Capricorn Records in the 1970s, including A Monkey in a Silk Suit Is Still a Monkey (1973).  Williams still plays with various bands in and around the Trenton, New Jersey area.

References

Living people
American funk keyboardists
American funk singers
Year of birth missing (living people)